FB, Fb, or fb may refer to:

Arts and media
 F♭ (musical note)
 FB (band), an electronic music collaboration of Benny Benassi and Ferry Corsten
 Facebook, a social networking website, also known as FB.com
 Meta Platforms, formerly Facebook Inc (Nasdaq: FB), parent company of Facebook
 Friendship book, a booklet swapped amongst pen pals
 Frostbite (game engine), a video game engine
 FB, known as Trucksy in the US, an old green pickup truck from Roary the Racing Car

Science and technology

Computing
 Framebuffer, in computer technology
 FreeBASIC, a 32-bit compiler using BASIC syntax for DOS, Windows, and Linux
 FictionBook, an open XML-based e-book format hailing from Russia

Other uses in science and technology
 F B, a Japanese military vehicle used for crossing difficult swampy terrain
 Fast busy, or reorder tone, a type of telephone signal
 Feedback, in signaling systems
 Femtobarn, a small unit of area used in high energy physics
 Fluidized bed, a special technology used in energy, reactor, chemical engineering etc.
 Hyundai FB, a series of buses manufactured by Hyundai Motor Company
 Foreign body, any object originating outside the body

Sport
 Fenerbahçe, a Turkish sports club
 Fly ball, a type of batted ball or a pitching stat in baseball
 Football
 Fullback (American football), a position in American football
 Full-back (association football), a position in association football

Other uses
 Bulgaria Air (Bulgarian: България еър, IATA code FB), the flag carrier airline of Bulgaria
 Firebase or Fire support base, an artillery encampment
 Footbridge (fb on some maps), a bridge designed for pedestrians

See also

 
 BF (disambiguation)